Darren Jolly (born 6 November 1981) is a former professional Australian rules footballer who played for the Melbourne Football Club, the Sydney Swans and the Collingwood Football Club in the Australian Football League (AFL). He is best known for being the ruckman in Sydney's 2005 premiership win and also Collingwood's 2010 premiership win.

Junior career
After completing his schooling at Damascus College Ballarat in 1996, and playing for the North Ballarat Rebels in the TAC Cup, Jolly spent a year playing for the North Ballarat Football Club in the Victorian Football League (VFL) before being drafted by the Melbourne Football Club in the 2001 Rookie Draft.

Melbourne
He played 48 games over four seasons for Melbourne, mainly as an understudy to Jeff White.

Sydney

The Demons traded Jolly to Sydney in 2004 for pick 15 in that year's national draft.  Along with Jason Ball, in 2005 he was an integral part of Sydney's ruck division and after the retirement of Ball, assumed the number one ruck role at Sydney.

During his time at the Swans Jolly only missed two games, stemming from a suspension following an incident against his old club Melbourne. This run was cut in early 2011 due to an injury suffered playing for Collingwood.

In the early hours of 29 September – one day before the Swans played in the 2006 AFL Grand Final – Jolly's wife Deanne gave birth to the couple's first child, Scarlett, which brought relief to coach Paul Roos, as Jolly had said he would not play in the Grand Final if his wife was to give birth on the day of the game.

Collingwood
At the end of the 2009 season, Jolly requested a trade be done so he could return to his native Victoria with his family.  Many clubs expressed initial interest in securing the senior ruckman, with Collingwood securing a trade in exchange for picks number 14 and 46 in the 2009 AFL Draft. Jolly immediately became Collingwood's number one ruckman, and in 2010 was named in the 40-man All-Australian team squad, but did not make the final team. Even though he did not make All Australian he was chose by BT in his team of the Year

Jolly's first two seasons at Collingwood mirrored his first two seasons with the Swans: he was part of Collingwood's premiership team in 2010, then part of its losing Grand Final team in 2011. Jolly played his 200th AFL game in round 19, 2011.

He was delisted by Collingwood at the conclusion of the 2013 AFL season.

Personal life

Jolly and his ex-wife Deanne have two daughters. After being delisted by the Magpies, he and ex-wife competed in the ninth season of The Block, a reality television series that follows couples as they compete to renovate a house. They returned for the tenth season of The Block in 2015, and ultimately won the 2015 series. As of 20 September 2019 Darren has left Deanne.

Statistics

|- style="background-color: #EAEAEA"
! scope="row" style="text-align:center" | 2001
|
| 41 || 4 || 0 || 1 || 5 || 5 || 10 || 2 || 2 || 14 || 0.0 || 0.3 || 1.3 || 1.3 || 2.6 || 0.5 || 0.5 || 3.5
|-
! scope="row" style="text-align:center" | 2002
|
| 11 || 18 || 7 || 1 || 46 || 39 || 85 || 27 || 16 || 100 || 0.4 || 0.1 || 2.6 || 2.2 || 4.7 || 1.5 || 0.9 || 5.6
|- style="background-color: #EAEAEA"
! scope="row" style="text-align:center" | 2003
|
| 11 || 19 || 4 || 0 || 72 || 66 || 138 || 47 || 24 || 260 || 0.2 || 0.0 || 3.8 || 3.5 || 7.3 || 2.5 || 1.3 || 13.7
|-
! scope="row" style="text-align:center" | 2004
|
| 11 || 7 || 0 || 0 || 16 || 8 || 24 || 11 || 5 || 44 || 0.0 || 0.0 || 2.3 || 1.1 || 3.4 || 1.6 || 0.7 || 6.3
|- style="background-color: #EAEAEA"
! scope="row" style="text-align:center" | 2005
|
| 16 || 24 || 10 || 4 || 110 || 75 || 185 || 64 || 42 || 442 || 0.4 || 0.2 || 4.6 || 3.1 || 7.7 || 2.7 || 1.8 || 18.4
|-
! scope="row" style="text-align:center" | 2006
|
| 16 || 25 || 2 || 5 || 141 || 68 || 209 || 55 || 46 || 605 || 0.1 || 0.2 || 5.6 || 2.7 || 8.4 || 2.2 || 1.8 || 24.2
|- style="background-color: #EAEAEA"
! scope="row" style="text-align:center" | 2007
|
| 16 || 23 || 16 || 7 || 162 || 65 || 227 || 95 || 46 || 458 || 0.7 || 0.3 || 7.0 || 2.8 || 9.9 || 4.1 || 2.0 || 19.9
|-
! scope="row" style="text-align:center" | 2008
|
| 16 || 24 || 15 || 11 || 160 || 111 || 271 || 105 || 47 || 543 || 0.6 || 0.5 || 6.7 || 4.6 || 11.3 || 4.4 || 2.0 || 22.6
|- style="background-color: #EAEAEA"
! scope="row" style="text-align:center" | 2009
|
| 16 || 22 || 16 || 12 || 134 || 127 || 261 || 92 || 61 || 682 || 0.7 || 0.5 || 6.1 || 5.8 || 11.9 || 4.2 || 2.8 || 31.0
|-
! scope="row" style="text-align:center" | 2010
|
| 18 || 26 || 24 || 10 || 172 || 155 || 327 || 131 || 58 || 579 || 0.9 || 0.4 || 6.6 || 6.0 || 12.6 || 5.0 || 2.2 || 22.3
|- style="background-color: #EAEAEA"
! scope="row" style="text-align:center" | 2011
|
| 18 || 16 || 12 || 4 || 74 || 100 || 174 || 51 || 60 || 383 || 0.8 || 0.3 || 4.6 || 6.3 || 10.9 || 3.2 || 3.8 || 23.9
|-
! scope="row" style="text-align:center" | 2012
|
| 18 || 20 || 12 || 4 || 94 || 124 || 218 || 58 || 72 || 649 || 0.6 || 0.2 || 4.7 || 6.2 || 10.9 || 2.9 || 3.6 || 32.5
|- style="background-color: #EAEAEA"
! scope="row" style="text-align:center" | 2013
|
| 18 || 9 || 4 || 4 || 48 || 58 || 106 || 40 || 32 || 209 || 0.4 || 0.4 || 5.3 || 6.4 || 11.8 || 4.4 || 3.6 || 23.2
|- class="sortbottom"
! colspan=3| Career
! 237
! 122
! 63
! 1234
! 1001
! 2235
! 778
! 511
! 4968
! 0.5
! 0.3
! 5.2
! 4.2
! 9.4
! 3.3
! 2.2
! 21.0
|}

References

External links

1981 births
Living people
Australian rules footballers from Victoria (Australia)
Collingwood Football Club players
Collingwood Football Club Premiership players
Melbourne Football Club players
North Ballarat Football Club players
Sydney Swans players
Sydney Swans Premiership players
Participants in Australian reality television series
Two-time VFL/AFL Premiership players